The United States Air Force's 234th Intelligence Squadron is an Air National Guard intelligence unit located at Beale Air Force Base, California.

History

Lineage
 234th Mobile Communications Flight
 Constituted as the 234th Airways and Air Communications Service Operations Flight and allotted to the Air National Guard
 Activated on 20 November 1952
 Redesignated 234th Airways and Air Communications Service Flight, Mobile c. 11 January 1953
 Redesignated 234th Mobile Communications Flight (Heavy) on 1 July 1961
 Inactivated  c. 20 January 1966

 234th Intelligence Squadron
 Constituted as the 234th Mobile Communications Squadron on 1 January 1966 and allotted to the Air National Guard
 Activated c. 6 September 1966
 Redesignated 234th Mobile Communications Squadron (Bare Base) on 16 March 1968
 Redesignated 234th Mobile Communications Squadron (Tactical Air Base) unknown
 Redesignated 234th Combat Communications Squadron (Tactical Air Base) on 1 April 1976
 Redesignated 234th Combat Information Systems Squadron on 1 July 1985
 Redesignated 234th Combat Communications Squadron on 1 October 1986
 Redesignated 234th Intelligence Squadron on 1 December 2004

Assignments
 144th Maintenance and Supply Group, 20 November 1952
 144th Fighter-Bomber Wing, c. 11 January 1953
 162d Communications Group (later 162d Mobile Communications Group, 162d Combat Communications Group, 162d Combat Informations Systems Group, 162d Combat Communications Group) (attached to 548th Intelligence Group after 1 December 2004), 1 July 1961 – c. 20 January 1966, c. 6 September 1966
 195th Wing, 1 September 2015 – present

Stations
 Hayward Municipal Airport, California, 20 November 1952 – c. 20 January 1966
 Hayward Municipal Airport (later Hayward Air National Guard Station), California, c. 6 September 1966
 Beale Air Force Base, California, c. 1 December 2004 – present

Equipment Operated

References

External links

Squadrons of the United States Air National Guard
0234